Christopher Dougherty (born 16 January 1988, Ireland) is an Irish cricketer who played for Leeds/Bradford MCC University in 2010. He made his List A debut for Ireland against Sri Lanka A cricket team at Civil Service Cricket Club Ground, Belfast where he scored 13 runs after opening the batting. He was part of Ireland's squad for the 2008 Under-19 Cricket World Cup.

He made his first-class debut for Northern Knights in the 2017 Inter-Provincial Championship on 30 May 2017. He made his Twenty20 debut for Northern Knights in the 2017 Inter-Provincial Trophy on 21 July 2017.

References

External links
 
 

1988 births
Living people
Irish cricketers
Leeds/Bradford MCCU cricketers
Northern Knights cricketers
Wicket-keepers